Diehl may refer to:

People

Surname

Arts
Arthur Diehl (1870–1929), English impressionist landscape artist
Carol Diehl, American artist, art critic and poet
Guy Diehl (born 1949), American painter
Gaston Diehl (1912–1999), French professor of art history and art critic
Hanns Diehl (1877–1946), German-Austrian painter
Volker Diehl (born 1957), German art gallery owner

Acting
August Diehl (born 1976), German actor
John Diehl (actor) (born 1950), American character actor
Karl Ludwig Diehl (1896–1958), German film actor

Entertainment
Aaron Diehl (born 1985), American jazz pianist
Alden Diehl (1931–2000), Canadian radio executive and comedian
Alex Diehl (born 1987), German singer and songwriter
Alice M. Diehl (1844-1912), English musician and writer
Caroline Diehl, British media executive

Politics
Conrad Diehl (1843–1918), American politician, mayor of Buffalo
Geoff Diehl (born 1969), American politician in Massachusetts
Guida Diehl (1868–1961), German Nazi party official
John Diehl (politician) (born 1965), American politician in Missouri
William J. Diehl (1845–1929), American industrialist and politician, mayor of Pittsburgh

Science
René Diehl (1912–1980), French archaeologist
Richard Diehl (born 1940), American archaeologist, anthropologist and academic
William Webster Diehl (1891–1978), American mycologist

Sports
Carl Diehl (1904–1997), American college football player
Dave Diehl (1918–1994),  American football player
David Diehl (born 1980), American football player
Ella Diehl (born 1978), Russian badminton player
Ernie Diehl (1877–1958), American baseball player
Ernst Diehl (born 1949), German footballer
George Diehl (1918–1986), American baseball player
John Diehl (American football) (1936–2012), American football player
Phillip Diehl (born 1994), American baseball player
Terry Diehl (born 1949), American golfer
Wally Diehl (1905–1954), American football player

Other
Charles Diehl (1859–1944), French historian
Edith Diehl (1876–1953), American bookbinder
Harold S. Diehl (1891–1973), American physician and anti-smoking activist
Jackson Diehl (born 1956), American journalist
James Diehl (born 1937), American minister and general superintendent in the Church of the Nazarene
Huston Diehl (1948–2010), American professor in Iowa
Karl Diehl (economist) (1864–1943), German economist
Mekayla Diehl (born 1988), American beauty pageant titleholder
Philip Diehl (inventor) (1847–1913), German-American mechanical engineer and inventor
Philip N. Diehl (born 1951), American businessman, director of the United States Mint
Pony Diehl (c. 1848–1888), American outlaw in the New Mexico Territory and Arizona Territory
Walter Stuart Diehl (1893–1976), U.S. Navy officer and aerodynamics and aircraft designer
William Diehl (1924–2006), American novelist and photojournalist

Given name
Diehl Mateer (1928–2012), American squash player

Companies
 Diehl Aerospace GmbH, a German aerospace company
 Diehl Defence GmbH & Co. KG, a German arms manufacturer
 Diehl Film, German filmmaking business (c. 1937–1970)
 Diehl Metall Stiftung & Co. KG, a German metal processing company
 House of Diehl, a New York–based fashion partnership

Military
 Diehl DM-41, a military projectile
 USNS Walter S. Diehl (T-AO-193), a U.S. Navy fleet replenishment oiler in service since 1988

See also
 Diehls Covered Bridge, in Bedford County, Pennsylvania
 George Diehl Homestead, in Cherryhill Township, Indiana County, Pennsylvania
 Oscar C. Diehl House, in Midland, Michigan
 
 

German-language surnames